The 2013–14 season was Klubi i Futbollit Tirana's 75th competitive season, 75th consecutive season in the Kategoria Superiore and 93rd year in existence as a football club.

The team's performance in the first half of the league season was among the worst in the club's history, losing 10 of 16 games, at times ranking at the bottom of the league. The team's manager was changed four times, and they were eliminated from the Albanian Cup in the second round. However, the club made a dramatic comeback in the second half of the season, winning 11 of 17 games with a single loss, allowing them to finish in 6th place and avoid relegation.

Season overview

June
The new season begun with Klodian Duro, Erjon Dushku, Arjan Pisha, Francesco Pigoni, Herby Fortunat, Arbër Abilaliaj, Julian Ahmataj, Elton Muçollari, Eleandro Pema, Darjo Xhuti all leaving the team officially. On 1 June, both Ilion Lika and Mario Morina asked for a transfer request after refusing to extend their contracts. Tirana refused to terminate Morina's contract and he took his case to the league's Conflict Resolution Room. On 5 June, club administrator Krenar Alimehmeti confirmed that youngsters Marsel Çaka and Erion Hoxhallari had signed new three-year contracts. On 10 June, Morina left the team to join Skënderbeu Korçë. Midfielder Gilman Lika was loaned to Skënderbeu Korçë for the club UEFA Champions League campaign. On 25 June, Morina officially became a player of Skënderbeu after winning a match against Tirana. On 12 June, Ilion Lika's contract ran out and he became a free agent. On the same day, youngsters Algi Lapardhaja, Glorian Hoxha, Alvi Gjoçaj, Klajdi Hyseni and Spartak Ajazi joined the team. Only Hoxha was offered a contract.

July
Tirana brought in Ilir Kastrati who accepted a contract after passing a trial. Defender Erjon Dushku joined Flamurtari Vlorë on a two-year contract after terminating his contract with Tirana in June. On 8 July, Tirana started their preparation phase on Pukë; they had only 18 players available. On 11 July, Fatmir Hysenbelliu's contract was extended; he joined the team on their preparation phase. On 13 July, midfielder Erando Karabeci was loaned to Kukësi for their Europa League qualifying campaign.

Tirana played its first friendly match on 15 July, winning 0–2 against Tërbuni Pukë with goals from Hoxha. Their second friendly occurred on 17 July when Tirana won 4–0 against rivals Dinamo. They played another friendly on 21 July versus Laçi; Mirel Çota scored their only goal in a 1–1 draw. Their next friendly occurred on 25 July; the team defeated Besa Kavajë with the brace of Afrim Taku. Tirana brought Ervis Çaço on a one-year contract on 26 July. They lost their next friendly 0–4 to Teuta Durrës. At the end of the month, Gilman Lika's contract expired and he purchased a career outside of Europe.

August
Tirana started the month with a 1–2 friendly loss to Dinamo. On 12 August, the club acquired defender Dorian Kërçiku from Skënderbeu Korçë. In the next friendly, Tirana won 1–0 versus Vllaznia Shkodër with a Çota goal. Tirana lost their next friendly match to Flamurtari Vlorë on 22 August. Three days later, Tirana drew 1–1 versus Tërbuni Pukë; Çota scored Tirana's only goal.

On 28 August, Tirana played their last friendly match of summer against the under-19 side; they won 3–0. The following day was a busy one for the club; Kosovan footballer Mensur Limani returned to the club on a one-year contract extension, and Tirana completed the transfers of defender Ervis Kaja and forward Ilirjan Çaushaj, also on one-year contracts. On 30 August, Erando Karabeci returned to the club following his European campaign with Kukësi. Veteran Elvis Sina agreed to a contract extension with the club, penning until June 2014. On the same day, Tirana reached an agreement with Roland Peqini and Vedran Gerc on one-year contracts. They were joined by Serbian forward Milan Jovanovic. On the deadline day, Tirana also signed Endrit Vrapi and Bledar Vashaku also on one-year deals. Forward Ergys Sorra was registered as Tirana player for the 2013–14 season after spending the entire summer on trial.

September
Tirana began their league campaign on 1 September by playing at home versus Laçi; the match finished in a goalless draw. Six days later, Tirana brought the Cape Verdean forward José Semedo on trial, which he passed and was given a one-year contract. Tirana then played their second league match versus Lushnja, winning 1–0 with a Gentian Muça penalty in the first half to collect their first three points of the season. In the remaining three matches of September, Tirana lost three times with the same result, 2–0, against Vllaznia Shkodër, Skënderbeu Korçë and Teuta Durrës.

October
Tirana had a 1–0 home win over Kastrioti Krujë with Semedo scoring in the 9th minute. In the first capital derby after five years, Tirana slumped into a 0–1 loss to Partizani after a howler from young goalkeeper Çaka which brought their only goal. This loss dropped the team to 10th place in the relegation zone. Due to performances, the club decided to reduce their roster and effectively halve the cost of players' salaries. Defender Roland Peqini suffered a major knee injury which required surgery hours before the league match versus Partizani; his recovery would take more than five months. Tirana bounced back and won round 8 against Bylis Ballsh, with a winning goal by Semedo. Forward Vedran Gerc was replaced after 45 minutes following his poor performance; he had a debate with donor Ndriçim Babasi. After the debate ended, Gerc punched through the dressing room glass, slicing his veins. He underwent surgery and remained sidelined for two months.

Tirana begun their Albanian Cup campaign by playing Albpetrol on 23 October. The team suffered an unexpected 0–1 away loss which resulted in the dismissal of manager Dede. Third choice goalkeeper Bledar Vashaku left the team after not getting paid at the club; he hadn't played a single field. Manager Dede was replaced by Alpin Gallo. On 27 July, he signed a monthly contract. His first match in charge was a 0–1 away loss to Besa Kavajë.

November
Tirana played at Selman Stërmasi Stadium against Flamurtari Vlorë on 2 November. Goals from Hair Zeqiri in the second half resulted in Tirana's second consecutive loss in the league. Three days later, manager Alpin Gallo approached youngsters Hanc Llagami, Mateos Cake, Franc Doko, Orges Horanlli, Daniel Sula and Indrit Take in the senior team. On 6 November, in the returning leg of Albanian Cup first round, Tirana won 3–1 against Albpetrol to progress to the next round. Mirel Çota scored two goals, his first in eight months and Afrik Taku scored the other.

Back in league play, Tirana suffered a loss against Kukësi at Zeqir Ymeri Stadium. Despite netting an opener inside first five minutes with Mateos Cake, Kukësi bounced back and scored twice in the last 10 minutes of the first half to win 2–1. This third consecutive loss dropped the team to last position in the league. It was the first time that Tirana had collected only 10 points in 11 weeks. In the next league match on 25 November, Tirana lost again, this time at the hands of Laçi with a single goal by Sajmir Kastrati. Four days later, manager Alpin Gallo resigned, with Sokol Bulku named the interim manager. In the last league match of the month, Tirana lost 1–2 to Lushnja at Abdurrahman Roza Haxhiu Stadium; Entonio Pashaj scored the goal for Tirana. This loss distanced the team 7 points from the safe zone. Manager Sokol Bulku was sacked following the match.

December
The month begun with Tirana appointing Gugash Magani as the new manager of the team until the end of the season. He became the team's fourth manager of the 2013–14 season. His first match was the first leg of Albanian Cup second round versus Lushnja; Tirana lost 0–1, their second loss in five days against the same opponent. Back in league, Tirana earned a hard-fought 1–1 draw against Vllaznia Shkodër; Arsen Hajdari opened the score for Vllaznia while Çota netted the equalizer in the second half. It was Tirana's first point after six matches.

In the next league match against Skënderbeu Korçë, Tirana lost 0–1 after a goal by Sabien Lilaj at the 59th minute. Tirana was eliminated from the Albanian Cup on 18 December after not going more than a 1–1 draw in the second leg, as the first match ended in a 0–1 loss. On 21 December, in the last league match of 2013, Tirana drew 1–1 against Teuta Durrës and finished the first part of the season at last place with 12 points, 9 points away from safe zone. On the same day, midfielder Fatmir Hysenbelliu announced his departure from the club with the aim of purchasing a career outside Albania. He was followed by José Semedo, Milan Jovanovic and Vedran Gerc, who were all released by the club.

Despite negative results, manager Gugash Magani was confirmed for the second part of season, with sponsor Refik Halili saying that he is not the problem. Tirana begun negotiations to terminate the contract with defender Roland Peqini after making only two appearances.

January
On 5 January, Ilion Lika become the first player to join Tirana in the winter transfer, signing a contract for the remainder of the season. The next day, the club brought Brazilian forwards Leandro Matias Moris and Gilberto Fortunato on trial, along with Amick Ciani and Amadou Sidibe. Xhino Sejdo and Denis Kurti left after not being in club's plans while Ilir Kastrati was sent on loan to Himara until the end of the season. Tirana played their first friendly of 2014 on 8 January; they won 1–0 against Tërbuni Pukë thanks to a Gentian Muça penalty. After the match, Leandro Matias Moris, Amick Ciani and Amadou Sidibe were not offered a contract and they all left. Gilberto remained on trial.

Tirana played a second friendly match of the year on 11 January, resulting in a goalless draw against Dinamo. On 13 January, Ivan Delić signed a six-month contract. A day later, forward Gilberto Fortunato left the club due to his salary demands. Tirana played their next friendly against the under-19 Tirana side on 15 January; they won 10–0. Two days later, forward Gilberto returned and signed a six-month contract with an option to renew, becoming the club's third winter signing.

Tirana took a goalless draw against Vllaznia Shkodër in the fourth friendly of January. On 20 January, Tirana acquired the services of Erlind Koreshi as a free agent; he signed a contract until the end of the season with an option to renew. Tirana played their next friendly on 22 January against Elbasani and won 2–0 with goals by Morina and Çota. Midfielder Francis Kahata was offered a contract after impressing in this friendly; he came on loan until the end of 2013–14 season. The next day, Tirana released Ilirjan Çaushaj who wished to terminate his contract.

On 27 January, Tirana brought back goalkeeper Xhino Sejdo with a new contract. Tirana and defender Roland Peqini reached an agreement to terminate his contract. On 31 January, Mario Morina officially signed a contract until the end of the season after arriving at the club since 13 January. On the same day, Selemani Ndikumana joined the club with a one-and-a-half year contract.

February
On 1 February, Tirana played Kastrioti Krujë in week 17; the match finished in a goalless draw despite the team having several good chances to score. Six days later, in the second capital derby against Partizani, Tirana won 1–0 thanks to an overhead kick of Gilberto, returning to the winning ways after nine consecutive matches. Tirana recorded another three points in the next round on 16 February, winning 0–1 at Bylis Ballsh thanks to the goal of Selemani Ndikumana. Tirana won their third consecutive league match on 23 February when they overturned Besa Kavajë 2–1 at home; Alked Çelhaka opened the score but Gilberto and Kërçiku overturned everything inside two minutes. This win lifted Tirana to 10th place, only one point away from the safety zone.

March
Tirana started March with a visit to Flamurtari Stadium to challenge Flamurtari Vlorë in the matchday 21. They opened the score first with Selemani Ndikumana before Flamurtari equalized through Ardit Shehaj. This draw was followed by the 3–1 home win over Kukësi; Afrim Taku scored an early opener with a penalty kick before Sokol Cikalleshi equalized the same way minutes later. In the second half Gilberto who scored a brace to seal the win, removing Tirana from the relegation zone. Tirana then traveled to Niko Dovana Stadium to face Teuta Durrës on 13 March; despite scoring first with Erando Karabeci, Tirana couldn't hold the lead and through the second half, finishing with a 1–1 draw. Tirana's first loss in 2014 league play was on 16 March; they slumped into a 1–2 home loss to Kukësi. Taku scored his team's only goal. It was the first loss in 11 matches. In the third and final capital derby against Partizani, Tirana opened the score with a Mario Morina goal in the 41st minute before conceding in the last moments of the match thanks to a Nderim Nexhipi header. In the last match of March, Tirana won 2–0 at home against Laçi; Kahata scored his first Tirana goal before Morina netted in the last minutes of the match.

April
Tirana's April began with a visit to the Skënderbeu Stadium to take on Skënderbeu Korçë on 5 April. The team scored twice in the first half with Morina and Kahata before Ndikumana netted a third in the 51st minute. Despite conceding twice from Pero Pejic, Tirana was able to win 3–2 and take another three points. On 8 April, veteran Elvis Sina confirmed his retirement at the end of the season. In the next three days, Tirana recorded another victory, winning 1–0 against Lushnja at Qemal Stafa Stadium with the header of Kahata, his third in the last three matches. This win lifted Tirana to 7th position. The next league match was a 3–0 walkover win over Bylis Ballsh as the club were excluded from the championship. Tirana played Vllaznia Shkodër in the matchday 30 on 26 February; the team recorded yet another win as they beat the visitors 2–1 with the goals of Endrit Vrapi and Morina. In the last match of April, Tirana won 2–3 at Kastrioti Krujë, recording their sixth consecutive success. Ardit Peposhi opened the score in the 38th minute, his first goal for Tirana. Then Gentian Muça scored with a penalty kick two minutes later. In the second half Kastrioti reopened the game with Erald Turdiu before Mensur Limani netted the third. The match ended 2–3 as Kastrioti scored in the last minutes with Nertil Ferraj. After this win, Tirana needed only one point to mathematically secure the survival with two games on hand.

May
Tirana begun May by earning a 2–2 away draw against Flamurtari Vlorë, which assured them the top flight spot for another season. Gilberto scored the first goal for Tirana while Morina added another one in the second half. After the match, manager Gugash Magani signed a contract extension for another season. Tirana was awarded a 3–0 walkover win against Besa Kavajë in Elvis Sina's final match as a professional. Verdhezinjtë refused to appear in the match. Tirana finished the championship in 6th place with 50 points, collecting 14 wins, 8 draws and 11 losses. They scored 36 goals and conceded 31.

Players

Squad information

From youth squad

Transfers

In

Summer

Winter

Out

Summer

Winter

Pre-season and friendlies

Competitions

Kategoria Superiore

League table

Results summary

Results by round

Matches

Albanian Cup

First round

Second round

Statistics

Squad stats
{|class="wikitable" style="text-align: center;"
|-
!
! style="width:70px;"|League
! style="width:70px;"|Cup
! style="width:70px;"|Total Stats
|-
|align=left|Games played     ||33 || 4 || 37
|-
|align=left|Games won        ||14 || 1 || 15
|-
|align=left|Games drawn      || 8 || 2 || 10
|-
|align=left|Games lost       ||11 || 2 || 13
|-
|align=left|Goals scored     ||36 || 4 || 40 
|-
|align=left|Goals conceded   ||31 || 4 || 35 
|-
|align=left|Goal difference  || 5 || 0 || 5
|-
|align=left|Clean sheets     ||12 || 0 || 12 
|-

Top scorers

Last updated: 10 May 2014

Clean sheets
The list is sorted by shirt number when total appearances are equal.

Last updated: 10 May 2014

References

External links
Official website

2013-14
Albanian football clubs 2013–14 season